The Order of Australia is an honour that recognises Australian citizens and other persons for outstanding achievement and service. It was established on 14 February 1975 by Elizabeth II, Queen of Australia, on the advice of the Australian Government. Before the establishment of the order, Australian citizens received British honours.

The Monarch of Australia is sovereign head of the order, while the Governor-General of Australia is the principal companion/dame/knight (as relevant at the time) and chancellor of the order. The governor-general's official secretary, Paul Singer (appointed August 2018), is secretary of the order. Appointments are made by the governor-general on behalf of the Monarch of Australia, based on recommendations made by the Council of the Order of Australia. Recent knighthoods and damehoods were recommended to the governor-general by the Prime Minister of Australia.

Levels of membership 
The order is divided into a general and a military division. The five levels of appointment to the order in descending order of seniority have been:
 Knight and Dame of the Order of Australia (AK and AD – inactive);
 Companion of the Order of Australia (AC – quota of 35 per year);
 Officer of the Order of Australia (AO – quota of 140 per year);
 Member of the Order of Australia (AM – quota of 605 per year); 
 Medal of the Order of Australia (OAM – no quota).
Honorary awards at all levels may be made to deserving non-citizens – these awards are made additional to the quotas.

Insignia

The badge of the Order of Australia is a convex disc (gold for AKs, ADs and ACs, gilt for AOs, AMs and OAMs) representing the Golden Wattle flower. At the centre is a ring, representing the sea, with the word 'Australia' below two branches of golden wattle. The whole disc is topped by the Crown of St Edward. The AC badge is decorated with citrines, blue enamelled ring, and enamelled crown. The AO badge is similar, without the citrines. For the AM badge, only the crown is enamelled, and the OAM badge is plain. The AK/AD badge is similar to that of the AC badge, but with the difference that it contains at the centre an enamelled disc bearing an image of the coat of arms of Australia.

The star for knights and dames is a convex golden disc decorated with citrines, with a blue royally crowned inner disc bearing an image of the coat of arms of Australia.

The ribbon of the order is blue with a central stripe of golden wattle flower designs; that of the military division has additional golden edge stripes. AKs, male ACs and AOs wear their badges on a necklet; male AMs and OAMs wear them on a ribbon on the left chest. Women usually wear their badges on a bow on the left shoulder, although they may wear the same insignia as males if so desired.

A gold lapel pin for daily wear is issued with each badge of the order at the time of investiture; AK/AD and AC lapel pins feature a citrine central jewel, AO and AM lapel pins have a blue enamelled centre and OAM lapel pins are plain.

The order's insignia was designed by Stuart Devlin.

Membership 
The order currently consists of four levels (one discontinued) and the medal, in both general and military divisions. Since 2015, the knight/dame level has been discontinued on the advice of then prime minister Malcolm Turnbull. Awards of knight and dame of the order have been made in the general division only.

While state governors can present the officer and member level and the Medal of the Order of Australia to their respective state's residents, only the King of Australia or the governor-general can present the companion level (and previously also the knight/dame level).

Award criteria in detail
The different levels of the order are awarded according to the recipients' levels of achievement:

Knight/Dame (1976–1983, 2014–2015)

 General Division: "Extraordinary and pre-eminent achievement and merit of the highest degree in service to Australia or to humanity at large".
 Military Division: Not awarded in the military division.
There was a quota of four per year, excluding honorary appointments. Knighthoods and damehoods were conferred from 1976 to 1983, and from 2014 to 2015, but are not currently awarded.

Companion (AC)

 General Division – "Eminent achievement and merit of the highest degree in service to Australia or to humanity at large".
 Military Division – "Eminent service in duties of great responsibility"'.
Excluding honorary appointments, until 2003, no more than 25 Companions were appointed in any
calendar year. In 2003 this was increased to 30. This was increased in 2016 to 35.

Officer (AO)
 General Division – "Distinguished service of a high degree to Australia or to humanity at large".
 Military Division – "Distinguished service in responsible positions".
Prior to 2003, the quota was 100 Officers appointed in any calendar year. This was increased to 125 in 2003 and increased again in 2016 to 140.

Member (AM)
 General Division – "Service in a particular locality or field of activity or to a particular group".
 Military Division – "Exceptional service or performance of duty".
Prior to 2003, the quota was 225 Members appointed in any calendar year. This was increased to 300 in 2003, to 340 in 2016, and to 365 in 2018.

Medal of the Order of Australia (OAM)
 General Division – "Service worthy of particular recognition"
 Military Division – "Meritorious service or performance of duty".
There are no quota limits on awards of the Medal of the Order.

Nomination and appointment 
Since 1976 any Australian citizen may nominate any person for an Order of Australia  award. People who are not Australian citizens may be awarded honorary membership of the order at all levels. Nomination forms are submitted to the Director, Honours Secretariat, a position within the Office of the Official Secretary to the Governor-General of Australia, at Government House, Canberra, which are then forwarded to the Council for the Order of Australia. The prime minister of the day appoints the Council chair and seven “community representatives”, while each state and territory appoints its representative and there are other ex officio members. The Council chair as at January 2021 was former Country Liberal Party Chief Minister of the Northern Territory Shane Stone. 

The Council makes recommendations to the governor-general. Awards are announced on Australia Day and on the King's Birthday public holiday in June, on the occasion of a special announcement by the governor-general (usually honorary awards), and on the appointment of a new governor-general. The governor-general presents the order's insignia to new appointees.

Appointments to the order are not made posthumously; however, if a nominee dies after accepting an appointment but before the relevant announcement date, the appointment stands and it is announced as having effect from no later than the date of the nominee's death. Awardees may subsequently resign from the order, and the Council may advise the governor-general to remove an individual from the order, who may cancel an award. 

Announcements of all awards, cancellations and resignations appear in the Commonwealth Gazette. People awarded honours have the option of not having the information appear on the "It's an Honour" website. Nomination forms are confidential and not covered by the Freedom of Information Act 1982 (Cth). The reasoning behind a nomination being successful or unsuccessful—and even the attendees of the meetings where such nominations are discussed—remains confidential.

History

Establishment
The Order of Australia was established on 14 February 1975 by letters patent of Queen Elizabeth II of Australia, the Australian monarch, and countersigned by the Prime Minister of Australia, Gough Whitlam. The original order had three levels: Companion (AC), Officer (AO) and Member (AM) as well as two divisions: Civil Division and Military Division. At the time it was also announced that Australian prime ministers would no longer nominate persons for British Imperial honours, but this new practice did not extend to nominations by state premiers.

On 24 May 1976, the level of Knight (AK) and Dame (AD) and the Medal of the Order of Australia (OAM), were created by the Queen on the advice of Whitlam's successor, Malcolm Fraser, and the Civil Division was renamed the General Division. The level of Knight/Dame was awarded only in the General Division.

The original three-level structure of the Order of Australia was modelled closely upon the Order of Canada, though the Order of Australia has been awarded rather more liberally, especially in regard to honorary awards to non-citizens. To date, only 24 non-Canadians have been appointed to the Order of Canada, while more than 420 non-Australians have been appointed to the Order of Australia, with 40 to the "Companion" level.

Knights and dames

Following the 1983 federal election, Prime Minister Bob Hawke advised the abolition of the knight/dame level.  On 3 March 1986, the Queen co-signed letters patent revoking the level, with existing knights and dames not being affected by the change.  In the period 1976–1983, twelve knights and two dames were created.

On 19 March 2014, Prime Minister Tony Abbott advised the Queen to reinstate the level of knight/dame and the Queen co-signed letters patent to bring this into effect. The change was publicly announced on 25 March, and gazetted on 17 April 2014. Up to four knights and/or dames could be appointed each year, by the Queen of Australia on the advice of the Prime Minister of Australia after consultation with the Chairman of the Order of Australia Council.

Five awards of knight and dame were then made, to the outgoing Governor-General, Quentin Bryce; her successor, Peter Cosgrove; a recent Chief of the Defence Force, Angus Houston; a recent Governor of New South Wales, Marie Bashir; and Prince Philip. This last award was met with ridicule and dismay by some in the Australian media.

The Australian Labor Party continued to oppose knighthoods and damehoods. Leader of the opposition Bill Shorten stated in March 2014 that the party would again discontinue the level if it were to win the next Australian federal election.

Abbott's tenure as prime minister ended in September 2015. Two months after coming into office, on 2 November 2015, pro-republican Prime Minister Malcolm Turnbull announced that the Queen had approved his request to amend the Order's letters patent and cease awards at this level. Existing titles would not be affected. The move was attacked by monarchists and praised by republicans. The amendments to the constitution of the Order were gazetted on 22 December 2015.

Current membership

Officials of the order
Sovereign Head of the Order: King of Australia (Charles III)
Chancellor and Principal Companion: Governor-General of Australia (David Hurley)
Secretary: Official Secretary to the Governor-General of Australia (Paul Singer)

King Charles III, when he was Prince of Wales, was appointed a Knight of the Order of Australia (AK) on 14 March 1981.  As he is not an Australian citizen, even though he was the heir to the Australian throne at the time, this would have required the award to be honorary.  To overcome this issue, his appointment was created by an amendment to the constitution of the Order of Australia by special letters patent signed by the Queen, on the recommendation of Prime Minister Malcolm Fraser.

In March 2014 the knight and dame levels, which had been abolished in 1986 by Prime Minister Bob Hawke, were reintroduced to the Order of Australia by Tony Abbott. At the same time, Abbott announced that future appointments at this level would be recommended by the prime minister alone, rather than by the Council of the Order of Australia, as is the case with all lower levels of the order. In accordance with the statutes of 2014, Prince Philip, Duke of Edinburgh was created a Knight of the Order by letters patent signed by the Queen on 7 January 2015, on Abbott's advice. Prince Philip's knighthood was announced as part of the Australia Day Honours on 26 January 2015 and his appointment attracted criticism of what Abbott described as his "captain's call".  Abbott responded by announcing that future recommendations for appointments as Knights and Dames of the Order would be determined by the Council of the Order of Australia.

Honorary awards
Awards of the Order of Australia are sometimes made to people who are not citizens of Australia to honour extraordinary achievements.  These achievements, or the people themselves, are not necessarily associated with Australia, although they often are.  On 26 January 2019, the Australian Honours website listed appointments for 40 Honorary Companions, 100 Honorary Officers, 127 Honorary Members of the Order of Australia and the award of 124 Honorary Medals of the Order of Australia. Notable honorary awards include:

 Honorary Companion
 All Honorary Companions of the Order of Australia are notable – see List of Honorary Companions of the Order of Australia
See also: :Category:Honorary Companions of the Order of Australia
 Honorary Officer
 Ali Alatas, Mel Gibson, Maina Gielgud, Hiroyuki Iwaki, Clive Lloyd, Lord Morris of Manchester, U.S. General David Petraeus, Admiral Harry Harris, Jerzy Toeplitz, Julius Tahija, Edo de Waart, Malcolm Williamson, Googie Withers and James Wolfensohn
 Fred Hollows, then a New Zealand citizen, was offered an honorary Officership in 1985, but declined the award; he became an Australian citizen in 1989, and in 1991 was appointed a substantive Companion of the Order
 Romaldo Giurgola was appointed an honorary Officer in 1989; this became a substantive award in 2000 when he adopted Australian citizenship
See also: :Category:Honorary Officers of the Order of Australia
 Honorary Member
Harriet Mayor Fulbright, Lord Harewood, Brian Lara, Sachin Tendulkar and Robyn Williams.
 Terri Irwin was appointed an Honorary Member in 2006; this became a substantive award when she became an Australian citizen in 2009
See also :Category:Honorary Members of the Order of Australia

Gender breakdown

Since 1975, just over 30 per cent of recipients of an Order of Australia honour have been women. The number of nominations and awards for women is trending up, with the 2023 Australia Day Honours resulting in the highest percentage of awards for women to date (47.1 per cent, 47.9 per cent in the general division). Advocacy groups such as Honour a Woman and the Workplace Gender Equality Agency have called for greater effort to be made to reach equal representation of men and women in the order.

Sociology of recipients of highest levels
In December 2010, The Age reported a study of the educational backgrounds of all people who had received Knight/Dame and Companion level awards at that time. It reported: "An analysis of the 435 people who have received the nation's top Order of Australia honours since they were first awarded in 1975, shows they disproportionately attended a handful of elite Victorian secondary schools. Scotch College alumni received the highest number of awards, with 19 former students receiving Australia's [then] highest honour".

Lists of recipients in categories

Order of Australia Association
On 26 January 1980 the order's award recipients formed the Order of Australia Association. This organisation seeks to aid the members of the order in their pursuits related to the development and maintenance of Australia's culture and traditions. The organisation also attempts to increase awareness of those honoured by the order, since many of their number are not household names, despite their contributions. Branches of the association can be found in all the states and territories of Australia.

Precedence
"Imperial" honours awarded after 5 October 1992 have been classed as "Foreign awards", and hence have lower precedence than all Australian awards.(Note, however, that the  Victoria Cross, and awards of the monarch, have retained their position in the order of precedence, even if awarded after 5 October 1992.)

References in popular culture
The award is parodied in the play Amigos, where the central character is determined to be awarded the AC, and uses persuasion, bribery and blackmail in his (ultimately successful) attempts to get himself nominated for the award.

During the 1996 season of the popular television programme Home and Away, the character Pippa Ross was awarded a Medal of the Order of Australia for her years of service as a foster carer.

See also
 Australian campaign medals
 Orders, decorations, and medals of Australia
 Australian Honours Order of Precedence
 Australian knights and dames
Living Australian knights and dames
 Commonwealth realms orders and decorations
 Order of Canada
 Order of New Zealand
 Order of the British Empire

Notes

References

External links

"It's an Honour" search of the Australian Honours database 
Order of Australia including list of the Order, its history and its "Constitution" (statutes).
Order of Australia Association
Medals of the World – Australia: The Order of Australia
Insignia of the Sovereign, and of Knights and Dames
General Division
Military Division

 
Australia, Order of
Awards established in 1975
Australia, Order Of
1975 establishments in Australia